Giáp Văn Cương (1921–1990) was an Admiral of the Vietnam People's Navy, was born on 13 September 1921 in Bảo Đài commune, Lục Nam district, Bắc Giang province. He participated in both the first Indochina War and the second Indochina War. In 1974, he was promoted to Major General, Deputy Chief of the General Staff of the Vietnam People's Army. In 1977, he was appointed Commander of the Vietnam People's Navy. In 1988, he was promoted to Admiral, the first Admiral of the Vietnam People's Navy.

References

1921 births
Vietnam People's Navy
Vietnamese admirals
Communist Party of Vietnam politicians
1990 deaths
North Vietnamese military personnel of the Vietnam War